Hangprinter is an open-source fused deposition modeling delta 3D printer notable for its unique frameless design. It was created by Torbjørn Ludvigsen. The Hangprinter uses relatively low cost parts and can be constructed for around US$250. The printer is part of the RepRap project, meaning many of the parts of the printer are able to be produced on the printer itself (partially self replicating). The design files for the printer are available on GitHub for download, modification and redistribution.

Versions

Version 0
The Hangprinter v0, also called the Slideprinter, is a 2D plotter. It was designed solely to test if a 3D version could realistically be created.

Version 1
The Hangprinter v1 uses counter weights to stay elevated.

Version 2
All parts of the Hangprinter Version 2 are contained within a single unit which uses cables to suspend the printer within a room, allowing it to create extremely large objects over 4 meters tall.

Version 3
Version 3 of the Hangprinter has the motors and gears attached to the ceiling, making the carriage lighter.

Version 4 
Version 4 includes upgrades from version 3 including flex compensation, better calibration and automatic homing.

Fused Particle Fabrication/Fused Granular Fabrication Hangprinters 
To enable 3D printers to economically use recycled plastic feedstocks to enable distributed recycling and additive manufacturing (DRAM) several types of fused granular fabrication (FGF)/fused particle fabrication (FPF) -based 3D printers have been designed and released with open source licenses.  First, a large-scale printer was demonstrated with a GigabotX extruder based on the open source cable driven hangprinter concept.  Then detailed plans using recyclebot auger techniques were released in HardwareX to build such a printer for under $1700. This approach would further reduce the cost of using hangprinters to make large scale products as the cost of recycled shredded plastic is ~$1-5/kg while filament is generally around $20/kg. Makers that have built open source granulators or have access to other types of waste plastic shredders (e.g. from Precious Plastic) can generate feedstock for hanging waste printers for under $1/kg, which makes large scale production with a hangprinter competitive with any conventional manufacturing process.

Patent dispute
In 2022, a patent describing the “Sky Big Area Additive Manufacturing” (SkyBAAM) system was granted to UT-Battelle, LLC, a nonprofit corporation that operates the Oak Ridge National Laboratory (ORNL). The patent describes the core features already featured in HangPrinter, causing controversy in the open source community. The RepRap project established a GoFundMe campaign to cover the legal costs in their upcoming action to challenge the patent.

External links

Development
 The Hangprinter Project's Webpage
 Torbjørn Ludvigsen's RepRap blog
 Hangprinter on Bountysource
 Hangprinter Facebook page

Repositories
 Hangprinter files on GitHub
 Hangprinter on RepRap wiki

Videos
 Hangprinter presentation, Torbjørn Ludvigsen
 The Hangprinter #3DMeetup, Thomas Sanladerer, YouTube
 RepRap HangPrinter Workshop at E3D with Torbjørn Ludvigsen, Richard Horne (RichRap), YouTube

References 

3D printers
Delta robots
RepRap project